Mutuelle de Seine-et-Marne was a French cycling team that existed from 1995 to 1998. The team participated in the 1997 Tour de France after being given a wildcard.

List of riders

References

Defunct cycling teams based in France
Cycling teams based in France
Cycling teams established in 1995
Cycling teams disestablished in 1998
1995 establishments in France
1998 disestablishments in France